Ethynylandrostanediol may refer to:

 17α-Ethynyl-3α-androstanediol (a synthetic androstane steroid)
 17α-Ethynyl-3β-androstanediol (a synthetic estrogen steroid)